The scattering length in quantum mechanics describes low-energy scattering.

The elastic cross section, at low energies is determined solely by the scattering length:

General concept 
When a slow particle scatters off a short ranged scatterer (e.g. an impurity in a solid or a heavy particle) it cannot resolve the structure of the object since its de Broglie wavelength is very long. The idea is that then it should not be important what precise potential  one scatters off, but only how the potential looks at long length scales. The formal way to solve this problem is to do a partial wave expansion (somewhat analogous to the multipole expansion in classical electrodynamics), where one expands in the angular momentum components of the outgoing wave. At very low energy the incoming particle does not see any structure, therefore to lowest order one has only a spherical outgoing wave, called the s-wave in analogy with the atomic orbital at angular momentum quantum number l=0. At higher energies one also needs to consider p and d-wave (l=1,2) scattering and so on.

The idea of describing low energy properties in terms of a few parameters and symmetries is very powerful, and is also behind the concept of renormalization.

A famous example, relevant for proton-proton scattering, is the Coulomb-modified scattering length.

Example

As an example on how to compute the s-wave (i.e. angular momentum ) scattering length for a given potential we look at the infinitely repulsive spherical potential well of radius  in 3 dimensions. The radial Schrödinger equation outside of the well is just the same as for a free particle:

The solution is readily found:

.

One can show that in general  for small  (i.e. low energy scattering). The parameter  of dimension length is defined as the scattering length. For our potential we have therefore , in other words the scattering length for a hard sphere is just the radius. (Alternatively one could say that an arbitrary potential with s-wave scattering length  has the same low energy scattering properties as a hard sphere of radius .)
To relate the scattering length to physical observables that can be measured in a scattering experiment we need to compute the cross section . In scattering theory one writes the asymptotic wavefunction as (we assume there is a finite ranged scatterer at the origin and there is an incoming plane wave along the -axis):

where  is the scattering amplitude. If we consider only s-wave scattering the differential cross section does not depend on the angle , and the total scattering cross section is just . The s-wave part of the wavefunction  is projected out by using the standard expansion of a plane wave in terms of spherical waves and Legendre polynomials :

This gives:

See also
Fermi pseudopotential
Neutron scattering length

References

Quantum mechanics
Scattering theory